Ballyboughal GAA is a Gaelic Athletic Association club based at Ballyboughal, Fingal, Ireland, serving Ballyboughal and its surrounding areas.

At adult level the club has two football teams competing in AFL2 and AFL9 and the Dublin Intermediate Football Championship and one ladies football team.

Achievements
Ballyboughal have won the Dublin Intermediate Football Championship in 1968 1972 and 2019 and the Dublin Junior Football Championship in 1967 and 2009. Club honours include:
 1967 Dublin Junior Football Championship Winners
 1968 Dublin Intermediate Football Championship Winner
 1972 Dublin Intermediate Football Championship Winner
 1991 Fingal Minor Football Championship Winner
 2009 Dublin Junior Football Championship Winner
 2009 Dublin AFL Div 5 Champions
 2010 Dublin AFL Div 4 Champions

References

Gaelic games clubs in Fingal
Gaelic football clubs in Fingal